XHFZO-FM is a Spanish & English Adult Contemporary language radio station in Ensenada, Baja California, Mexico, broadcasting on 92.9 FM. The station broadcasts from Cerro La Bufadora, located northwest of Ensenada.

History 
In March 1994, the Secretariat of Communications and Transportation awarded the rights to 92.9 MHz in Francisco Zarco, Baja California, to Rommel Arvizu Rashid.

External links 
Amor Mio Facebook

References 

Radio stations in Ensenada, Baja California
Radio stations established in 1994
1994 establishments in Mexico